The history of violence against LGBT people in the United States is made up of assaults on gay men, lesbians, bisexuals, and transgender individuals (LGBT), legal responses to such violence, and hate crime statistics in the United States of America. Those targeted by such violence are believed to violate heteronormative rules and contravene perceived protocols of gender and sexual roles. People who are perceived to be LGBT may also be targeted. Violence can also occur between couples who are of the same sex, with statistics showing that violence among female same-sex couples is more common than among couples of the opposite sex, although male same-sex violence is less common.

Extensive violence has been directed against the LGBT community for decades. Since the 1969 Stonewall riot against one of the many police raids on gay bars altered the goal of LGBT rights activists from assimilation to acceptance, there have been many more reports and instances of violence against LGBT people in the United States. Dozens of transgender and gender-nonconforming individuals are murdered every year in the US, and the murder of black transgender women is especially prevalent. Attacks against LGBT people generally center on the idea that there is a normal way for people to live, which encompasses all expressions, desires, behaviors, and roles associated with the gender each person was assigned to at birth, known as heteronormativity and cisnormativity. Over time the number of these acts of violence has increased greatly, whether due to the changing religious and political views, increased community visibility, or other factors. There have been political protests intended to bring about harsher penalties for these crimes.

A hate crime is defined as the victimization of individuals because of their actual or perceived race, ethnicity or national origin, sexual orientation, religion, gender, gender identity or disability. Hate crimes against LGBTQIA people often occur because the perpetrators are homophobic or transphobic.  Violence targeted at people because of their perceived sexuality can be either psychological or physical up to and including murder. These actions may be caused by cultural, religious, or political mores and biases. Victims of violence who are both LGBT and a person of color may have trouble distinguishing whether the violence was based on their sexuality/gender identity or whether racism also played a significant factor. An intersectional approach would examine how these forms of discrimination combine in unique ways.

The United States has passed the Hate Crime Statistics Act (P.L. 101–275), in order to develop a systematic approach for documenting and understanding hate crimes against LGBT people in the United States. The Federal Bureau of Investigation (FBI) has also implemented a data collection program and integrated the system under their Uniform Crime Reporting (UCR) program and National Incident-Based Reporting System (NIBRS).

Federal hate crime statistics
In 2014, the Federal Bureau of Investigation (FBI) reported that 20.8% of hate crimes reported to police in 2013 were founded on sexual orientation. Sixty-one percent of those attacks were against gay men.  Additionally, 0.5% of all hate crimes were based on perceived gender identity.   In 2004, the FBI reported that 14% of hate crimes due to perceived sexual orientation were against lesbians, 2% against heterosexuals and 1% against bisexuals.

The FBI reported that for 2006, hate crimes against gay people increased from 14% to 16% in 2005, as percentage of total documented hate crimes across the U.S.  The 2006 annual report, released on November 19, 2007, also said that hate crimes based on sexual orientation are the third most common type, behind race and religion. 
In 2008, 17.6% of hate crimes were based on the victim's perceived sexual orientation. Of those crimes, 72.23% were violent in nature. 4,704 crimes were committed due to racial bias and 1,617 were committed due to sexual orientation. Of these, only one murder and one forcible rape were committed due to racial bias, whereas five murders and six rapes were committed based on sexual orientation.

Santa Clara County Deputy District Attorney (DDA) Jay Boyarsky attributed a surge in anti-gay hate crimes, from 3 in 2007 to 14 in 2008, to controversy over Proposition 8. However, the DDA cautioned against reading too much from small statistical samples, pointing out that the vast majority of hate incidents do not get referred to the District Attorney's office.

In 2011, the FBI reported 1,572 hate crime victims targeted based on a sexual orientation bias, making up 20.4% of the total hate crimes for that year. Of the total victims. 56.7% were targeted based on anti-male homosexual bias, 29.6% were targeted based on anti-homosexual bias, and 11.1% were targeted based on anti-female homosexual bias.

The United States, however, does not make reporting on hate crimes mandatory, meaning the FBI data gathered over the years is not an accurate representation of the correct number of hate crimes against LGBT Americans. Community-based anti-violence organizations are extremely valuable when reporting on or gathering statistics about hate crimes.

In recent years LGBT violence has been on the rise in the United States. The biggest act of violence occurred in Orlando when Omar Mateen attacked the Pulse nightclub in the city killing 49 and wounding 53 others. This was not only the biggest attack on LGBT people but one of the biggest mass shootings in the United States history. By June 2018, the FBI had declined to classify the incident as an anti-gay hate crime, as evidence suggested that Mateen had scouted several different targets before choosing Pulse and that he did not know it was a gay nightclub. There were also 28 Americans who identified as LGBT and were killed in 2016 alone. The United States has passed some legislation to combat increasing violence against LGBT people. In the late 1990s, the Hate Crime Statistics Act (P.L. 101–275) was passed to try to prevent further hate crimes and enhance criminal sentences for people who do commit them. While this act was passed more than 20 years ago, local police officers often have no training on identification of hate crimes based on sexual preference. In 2009, the Matthew Shepard and James Byrd Jr. Hate Crimes Prevention Act was passed, which added gender, sexual orientation, gender identity, and disability to federal hate crime law.

Measures to stop violence against LGBT people 
Violence against people in the LGBT community is a serious issue, and it’s important to take certain measures and protocols to help prevent this issue. Education plays a major role in changing the behavior and attitudes. It is important to educate people about the issues that LGBT people face in their daily lives in efforts to promote understanding and acceptance. Educating people about different sexual orientations and gender identities will raise awareness about the issues and challenges faces by LGBT individuals. This can also help to stop prejudice or discrimination towards LGBT people. Educating people at an early age on these topics can help to provide a safe space for people in the community for younger people as they are growing up. Another way to prevent violence is community involvement and support services. By building a community that supports and celebrates diversity, it will provide a safe space for people in the LGBT community. This can be done by organizing events or gatherings to bring awareness and promote acceptance. This can be helpful because this can provide a safe space for victims to share their stories and educate others. Lambda Legal is an organization committed to protecting civil rights among member of the LGBT community. True Colors Fund and the Human Rights Campaign are organizations that help homeless LGBT youth to receive healthcare, housing, and education. There are organizations throughout the United States that provide safety and care for people in the LGBT community. The NCAVP also known as the National Coalition of Anti-Violence Programs, discovers ways to prevent all forms of violence against LGBT communities. This advocacy for people in the LGBT community plays an important role in fighting for the rights of people in this community. The NCAVP raises awareness about violence in the LGBT community and protests for changes in laws and policies and provide support to victims of violence. By taking these steps, we can help prevent violence against LGBT people and create a more accepting and inclusive society for everyone.

Effects of violence against LGBT People 
There are many effects of violence against LGBT people on both their psychological or mental health and physical health. Violent acts, including domestic and sexual abuse, towards the LGBT community may lead to depression, PTSD, suicidal behaviors, or trauma. According to the authors of "The Effects of Polyvictimization on Mental and Physical Health Outcomes in an LGBTQ Sample", many people, especially LGBT, experience effects of anti-LGBT violence: "Although adverse outcomes may result from many different types of trauma exposure, the experience of interpersonal trauma or violence is particularly damaging compared to non-interpersonal trauma, and individuals with histories of interpersonal trauma are at increased risk for developing psychiatric conditions, including post-traumatic stress disorder (PTSD), depression, dissociation, and substance use issues.”

Hate crimes also affect the physical health of LGBT people. Victims of anti-LGBT violence may not want to follow their previous lifestyle. According to the authors of the research article, “Psychological Sequelae of Hate-Crime Victimization Among Lesbian, Gay, and Bisexual Adults”, it takes time to recover from the violence. During their experiment, they observed that psychological distress increases for people who experienced violence within the previous 2 years. People who had been victimized more than 2 years ago had more mental issues including depression, anxiety, trauma, and many more: “It might also increase the length of time needed for recovery from a hate crime. In post hoc analyses of distress levels according to year of victimization, we observed that respondents tended to manifest elevated psychological distress if their most recent victimization occurred within the previous 2 years. Among respondents who had been victimized 3 to 5 years earlier, hate-crime victims had more symptoms of depression, anxiety, anger, and traumatic stress than non-bias crime victims.” 

Violence against LGBT people does not exclude youth. LGBT youth might experience violence or rejection at school or from their family. For example, “Family violence against gay and lesbian adolescents and young people: a qualitative study.” mentions that family reactions to a youth “coming out” were violent. This then also affects a person's health and quality of life. The author then states how family violence against LGBT youth affects them: “Studies show that rejection and family violence in the out-coming process and the non-provision of social support have a direct impact on the health of homosexual adolescents and young people, with consequences such as: social isolation, depression, suicidal ideation and attempt, low performance, low self-esteem, higher social exposures and an increase in internalized homophobia.”

Violence against LGBT people since 1969

1969-1979

 March 9, 1969  – Howard Efland, a gay man who had checked into the Dover Hotel in Los Angeles, under the pseudonym J. McCann, was beaten to death by officers of the Los Angeles Police Department.
 June 28, 1969 – Police, in the early morning hours, raided a gay bar, the Stonewall Inn, located in the Greenwich Village neighborhood of Manhattan, New York City. This event sparked the Stonewall riots, which were a series of demonstrations by members of the LGBT community.

 June 24, 1973 – An arsonist burned the Upstairs Lounge, a gay bar in New Orleans, killing 32 people.
 June 21, 1977 – Robert Hillsborough was stabbed to death in San Francisco by a man shouting "faggot".
 July 5, 1978 – A gang of youths armed with baseball bats and tree branches assaulted several men in an area of Central Park in New York City that was known to be frequented by homosexuals.  The victims were assaulted at random, but the assailants later confessed that they had deliberately set out to the park to attack homosexuals.  One of those injured was former figure skater Dick Button, who was assaulted while watching a fireworks display in the park.
 November 27, 1978 – Openly gay San Francisco city supervisor Harvey Milk, along with Mayor George Moscone, was assassinated by political rival Dan White at San Francisco City Hall. Outrage over the assassinations and the short sentence given to White (seven years) prompted the White Night riots.
 January 1979 – Tennessee Williams was beaten by five teenage boys in Key West. He escaped serious injury. The episode was part of a spate of anti-gay violence inspired by an anti-gay newspaper ad run by a local Baptist minister.
 June 5, 1979 – Terry Knudsen was beaten to death by three men in Loring Park in Minneapolis, Minnesota.
 September 7, 1979 –  Robert Allen Taylor was stabbed to death near Loring Park in Minneapolis. A local reporter interviewed the murderer from jail and was told, "I don't like gays. Okay?"
 October 7, 1979 – 17-year-old  Steven Charles of Newark, New Jersey, was beaten to death in New York City by Robert DeLicio, Costabile "Gus" Farace, Farace's cousin Mark Granato, and David Spoto. They also beat Charles' friend, 16-year-old Thomas Moore of Brooklyn. Moore was critically injured but managed to get help at a nearby residence. Moore identified the four men via a lineup four days after the incident. Farace, the leader of the attack, pleaded guilty to first-degree manslaughter and was paroled after eight years, in 1988. He himself was murdered on November 17, 1989.

1980–1989
 1982 – Rick Hunter and  John Hanson were beaten by Minneapolis police outside the Y'all Come Back Saloon on January 1, 1982. Hennepin County Hospital emergency room staff employees testified in court that the police called the two men "faggots" while the men were being treated for their injuries.
 1982 – Robert Altom died after being attacked by Cecil Corrie Turner outside the former JB's Paradise Room on North Vancouver Avenue in Portland, Oregon. 
 1984 – Charlie Howard was drowned in Bangor, Maine, for being "flamboyantly gay".
 January 17, 1987 – Shelby bookstore murders: Three men were killed and two more were seriously wounded after being shot execution-style at an adult bookstore known as a meeting place for homosexuals. Three or four gunmen were involved in the attack and the gunmen set the bookstore on fire after the shooting. Two members of the White Patriot Party were charged for the shooting, though one was acquitted at trial and the second had his charges dropped. The case is unsolved.
 December 15, 1987 – Anthony Milano was killed in Levittown, PA after two men alleged he was gay. His attackers, Frank Chester and Richard Laird, were sentenced to death row in Pennsylvania in 1988.
 May 13, 1988 – Rebecca Wight was killed when she and her partner, Claudia Brenner, were shot by Stephen Roy Carr while hiking and camping along the Appalachian Trail. Carr later claimed that he became enraged by the couple's lesbianism when he saw them having homosexual relations.
 May 15, 1988 – Tommy Lee Trimble and John Lloyd Griffin, two gay men, were harassed and later shot by Richard Lee Bednarski in Dallas, Texas. Bednarski was later convicted of the two murders but was sentenced to 30 years rather than life in prison. The judge who issued the sentence, Jack Hampton, said later that he did so because the victims were homosexuals who would not have been killed if they "hadn't been cruising the streets" for men. Hampton's comments caused considerable controversy. He was later censured for his remarks and ultimately lost a bid for judicial re-election in 1992.
 November 22, 1988 – Gordon Church, a gay man, was raped, tortured, and murdered by Michael Archuleta and Lance Wood in Utah. Wood was sentenced to life in prison, while Archuleta, who was believed to have been the primary instigator, was sentenced to death.
 December 1988 – Venus Xtravaganza, a transgender performer, was found murdered on Christmas. It was estimated that she had been dead for 4 days.

1990–1999
 1990 – James Zappalorti, a gay Vietnam veteran, was stabbed to death in Staten Island, New York.
 July 2, 1990 –  Julio Rivera was murdered in New York City by two men who beat him with a hammer and stabbed him with a knife because he was gay.
 1991 – Paul Broussard, a Houston-area banker, was murdered. He was attacked by 10 young men along with Clay Anderson and Richard Delaunay, who survived. All ten of the attackers were eventually convicted, with sentences ranging from probation and fine for the respective hospitalization and funeral bills to the 45-year imprisonment of Jon Buice, who confessed to inflicting the fatal stab wound.
 October 27, 1992 – U.S. Navy Petty Officer Allen Schindler was murdered by a shipmate who stomped him to death in a public restroom in Japan. Schindler had complained repeatedly about anti-gay harassment aboard ship. The case became synonymous with the debate over gay people serving in the US military that had been brewing in the United States culminating in the "Don't ask, don't tell" bill.
 1993 – Brandon Teena, a trans man, was raped and later killed when his birth gender was revealed by police to male friends of his. The events leading to  Teena's death were depicted in the movie Boys Don't Cry.
 March 9, 1995 – Scott Amedure was murdered after revealing his attraction to his friend Jonathan Schmitz on a The Jenny Jones Show episode about secret crushes. Schmitz purchased a shotgun to kill Amedure and did so after Amedure implied he still was attracted to him; Schmitz then turned himself in to police.
 November 20, 1995 –  Chanelle Pickett, 23, an African American trans woman, died at the home of William C. Palmer after a fight that, according to Palmer, ensued after Palmer discovered that she was transgender and demanded she leave his home. Patrons of the Playland Café, where they had met, said that Palmer was a regular there with a well known preference for transsexuals.
 December 4, 1995 – Roxanne Ellis and Michelle Abdill, a lesbian couple in Medford, Oregon, were murdered by a man who said he had "no compassion" for bisexual or homosexual people. Robert Acremant was convicted and sentenced to death by lethal injection.
 January 4, 1996 – Fred Mangione, a gay man, was murdered in Texas by two Neo-Nazi brothers. His partner, Kenneth Stern, was also attacked, but survived. One of the attackers, Ronald Henry Gauthier, later received a 10-year probation sentence.
 May 1996 –  Julianne Williams, 24, and Lollie Winans, 26, were murdered at their campsite along the Appalachian Trail on Virginia's Skyline Drive in Shenandoah National Park. They were bound and gagged and their throats were slit. To date, there has been no conviction in the murders.
 August 1, 1996 –  Nick Moraida, a 34-year-old Latino gay man, was murdered during a robbery. His murderer, Richard Cartwright, was given the death penalty. 
 February 21, 1997 – Otherside Lounge bombing, a lesbian nightclub in Atlanta, was bombed by Eric Robert Rudolph, the "Olympic Park Bomber;" five bar patrons were injured. In a statement released after he was sentenced to five consecutive life terms for his several bombings, Rudolph called homosexuality an "aberrant lifestyle".
 October 7, 1998 – Matthew Shepard, a gay student, in Laramie, Wyoming, was tortured, beaten severely, tied to a fence, and abandoned; he was found 18 hours after the attack and succumbed to his injuries less than a week later, on October 12. His attackers, Russell Arthur Henderson and Aaron James McKinney are both serving two consecutive life sentences in prison.
 February 19, 1999 –  Billy Jack Gaither, a 39-year-old gay man, was brutally beaten to death in Rockford, Alabama. His attackers, Steve Mullins and Charles Monroe Butler were found guilty of murder and were both sentenced to life imprisonment without parole.
 July 1, 1999 – Gay couple Gary Matson and Winfield Mowder was murdered by white supremacist brothers Benjamin Matthew and James Tyler Williams in Redding, California. James Williams was sentenced to a minimum of 33 years in prison, to be served after his completion of a 21-year sentence for firebombing synagogues and an abortion clinic. Benjamin Williams claimed that by killing the couple he was "obeying the laws of the Creator". He died by suicide in 2003 while awaiting trial. Their former pastor described the brothers as "zealous in their faith" but "far from kooks".
 July 6, 1999 – Barry Winchell, a 21-year-old infantry soldier in the United States Army, was bludgeoned to death with a baseball bat as he slept in his barracks at Fort Campbell after being harassed for his relationship to Calpernia Addams. His assailants, Calvin Glover (18) and Justin Fisher (26) were charged with his murder. Glover was sentenced to life in prison and Fisher was sentenced to 12.5 years but only served 7.
 September 1999 – Steen Fenrich was murdered, apparently by his stepfather, John D. Fenrich, in Queens, New York. His dismembered remains were found in March 2000, with the phrase "gay nigger number one" scrawled on his skull along with his social security number. His stepfather fled from police while being interviewed, then killed himself.
 October 15, 1999 – Sissy "Charles" Bolden was found shot to death in Savannah, Georgia. Police arrested Charles E. Wilkins, Jr., in July 2003; he admitted the killing and was charged with two other homicides, according to the Savannah Police Department.

2000–2009
On April 29, 2009, the U.S. House of Representatives voted to extend federal law to classify as "hate crimes" attacks based on a victim's sexual orientation or gender identity (as well as mental or physical disability). The U.S. Senate passed the bill on October 22, 2009. The Matthew Shepard and James Byrd, Jr. Hate Crimes Prevention Act was signed into law by President Barack Obama on October 28, 2009.

 July 3, 2000 – Arthur "J.R." Warren was punched and kicked to death in Grant Town, West Virginia, by two teenage boys who reportedly believed Warren had spread a rumor that he and one of the boys, David Allen Parker, had a sexual relationship. Warren's killers ran over his body to disguise the murder as a hit-and-run. Parker pleaded guilty and was sentenced to "life in prison with mercy", making him eligible for parole after 15 years. His accomplice, Jared Wilson, was sentenced to 20 years.
 September 22, 2000 – Ronald Gay entered a gay bar in Roanoke, Virginia, and opened fire on the patrons, killing Danny Overstreet, 43 years old, and severely injuring six others. Ronald said he was angry over what his name now meant, and deeply upset that three of his sons had changed their surname. He claimed that he had been told by God to find and kill lesbians and gay men, describing himself as a "Christian Soldier working for my Lord"; Gay testified in court that "he wished he could have killed more fags," before several of the shooting victims as well as Danny Overstreet's family and friends.
 June 16, 2001 – Fred Martinez, a transgender and two-spirit student, was bludgeoned to death near Cortez, Colorado, by 18-year-old Shaun Murphy, who reportedly bragged about attacking a "fag".
 August 25, 2001 Gary Raynall was found brutally beaten to death  in Leawood, Kansas. The case is still unsolved and family members believe his death was a hate crime.
 June 12, 2002 – Philip Walsted, a gay man, was fatally beaten with a baseball bat. According to prosecutors, the neo-Nazi views of Walsted's assailant, David Higdon, led to what was originally a robbery escalating to murder. Higdon was sentenced to life in prison, plus an additional sentence for robbery.
 August 6, 2002 – Rodney Velasquez, a 26-year-old Latino gay man, was found murdered in the bathtub of his Bronx apartment.
 October 3, 2002 – Gwen Araujo, a teenage trans woman, was murdered by at least three men who were charged with committing a hate crime. Two were convicted of murder, the third manslaughter; however, the jury rejected the hate crime enhancement.
 December 24, 2002 – Nizah Morris, a 47-year-old black trans woman, was possibly murdered in Philadelphia, Pennsylvania.
 December 12, 2001 – Terrianne Summers, a 51-year-old trans woman and activist for transgender rights, was shot and killed in her front yard in Florida. No arrests were made, and police did not investigate her murder as a hate crime. Terrianne's high visibility as a trans woman due to her work as an activist has led her to be included in lists of anti-LGBT hate crimes, although lack of police interest in her murder means the motives behind the killing may never be known.
 May 11, 2003 – Sakia Gunn, a black 15-year-old lesbian, was murdered in Newark, New Jersey. While waiting for a bus, Gunn and her friends were propositioned by two men. When the girls rejected their advances, declaring themselves to be lesbians, the men attacked them. One of the men, Richard McCullough, fatally stabbed Gunn. In exchange for his pleading guilty to several lesser crimes including aggravated manslaughter, prosecutors dropped murder charges against McCullough, who was sentenced to 20 years.
 June 17, 2003 – Richie Phillips of Elizabethtown, Kentucky, was killed by Joseph Cottrell. His body was later found in a suitcase in Rough River Lake. During his trial, two of Cottrell's relatives testified that he lured Phillips to his death, and killed him because he was gay. Cottrell was convicted of manslaughter and sentenced to 20 years in prison.
 July 23, 2003 – Nireah Johnson and Brandie Coleman were shot to death by Paul Moore, when Moore learned after a sexual encounter that Johnson was transgender. Moore then burned his victims' bodies. He was convicted of murder and sentenced to 120 years in prison.
 July 31, 2003 – 37-year-old Glenn Kopitske was shot and stabbed in the back by 17-year-old Gary Hirte in Winnebago County, Wisconsin. Prosecutors contended that Hirte murdered Kopitske to see if he could get away with it. Hirte pleaded insanity, claiming he killed Kopitske in a murderous rage after a consensual sexual encounter with the victim, because he felt a homosexual act was "worse than murder". The 'temporary insanity' mitigation plea was not upheld, he was found guilty, and received a life sentence.
 August 2003 – Emonie Spaulding, a black 25-year-old trans woman, was shot to death in Washington, D.C., by Derrick Antwan Lewis after he discovered she was trans.
 July 22, 2004 – 18-year-old Scotty Joe Weaver of Bay Minette, Alabama, was murdered. His burned and partially decomposed body was discovered a few miles from the mobile home in which he lived. He was beaten, strangled and stabbed numerous times, partially decapitated, and his body was doused in gasoline and set on fire. Three people were charged with capital murder and robbery in connection with the crime, two of whom were Weaver's roommates: Christopher Gaines, aged 20, Nichole Kelsay, aged 18, and Robert Porter, aged 18. Nichole Kelsay had been Weaver's friend throughout most of his life. 
 October 2, 2004 – Daniel Fetty, a gay man who was hearing-impaired and homeless, was attacked by multiple assailants in Waverly, Ohio. Fetty was beaten, stomped, shoved nude into a garbage bin, impaled with a stick, and left for dead; he succumbed to his injuries the next day. Prosecutors alleged a hate crime. Three men received sentences ranging from seven years to life.
 January 28, 2005 – Ronnie Antonio Paris, a three-year-old boy living in Tampa, Florida, died due to brain injuries inflicted by his father, Ronnie Paris, Jr. According to his mother and other relatives, Ronnie Paris, Jr., repeatedly slammed his son into walls, slapped the child's head, and "boxed" him because he was concerned the child was gay and would grow up a sissy. Paris was sentenced to thirty years in prison.
 On February 27, 2005, in Santa Fe, New Mexico, 21-year-old James Maestas was assaulted outside a restaurant, then followed to a hotel and beaten unconscious by men who called him "faggot" during the attack. Although all of his attackers were charged with committing a hate crime, none was sentenced to prison.
 March 11, 2005 – Jason Gage, an openly gay man, was murdered in his Waterloo, Iowa, apartment by an assailant, Joseph Lawrence, who claimed Gage had made sexual advances to him. Gage was bludgeoned to death with a bottle, and stabbed in the neck, probably post-mortem, with a shard of glass. Lawrence was sentenced to fifty years in prison.
 October 25, 2005 – Emanuel Xavier, an openly gay poet and activist, was surrounded and brutally beaten by a group of fifteen to twenty teens on the streets of Bushwick which left him permanently deaf in his right ear.
 February 2, 2006 – 18-year-old Jacob D. Robida entered a bar in New Bedford, Massachusetts, confirmed that it was a gay bar, and then attacked patrons with a hatchet and a handgun, wounding three. He fatally shot himself three days later.
 June 10, 2006 – Kevin Aviance, a female impressionist, musician, fashion designer and "oldest daughter" of the legendary House of Aviance was robbed and beaten in Manhattan by a group of men who yelled anti-gay slurs at him. Four assailants pleaded guilty and received prison sentences.
 July 30, 2006 – Six men were attacked with baseball bats and knives after leaving the San Diego Gay Pride festival. One victim was injured so severely that he had to undergo extensive facial reconstructive surgery. Three men pleaded guilty in connection with the attacks and received prison sentences. A 15-year-old juvenile also pleaded guilty.
 October 8, 2006 – Michael Sandy was attacked by four young heterosexual men who lured him into meeting after chatting online, while they were looking for gay men to rob. He was struck by a car while trying to escape his attackers, and died five days later without regaining consciousness.
 February 27, 2007 – Andrew Anthos, a 72-year-old disabled gay man, was beaten with a lead pipe in Detroit, Michigan, by a man who was shouting anti-gay slurs at him. Anthos died 10 days later in the hospital.
 March 15, 2007 – Ryan Keith Skipper, a 25-year-old gay man, was stabbed to death in Wahneta, Florida. Four suspects were arrested for the crime. The Sheriff called it a hate crime.
 March 16, 2007 – Ruby Ordeñana, a 24-year-old Latina transgender woman, was found naked and strangled to death in San Francisco, California, at 5:40 am. Donzell Francis, who was suspected of raping and strangling Ordeñana, was convicted on December 23, 2009, and sentenced to 17 years and 18 months in prison for forcible oral copulation, robbery, assault causing great bodily injury, and false imprisonment of another transgender woman.
 May 12, 2007 – Roberto Duncanson was murdered in Brooklyn, New York. He was stabbed to death by Omar Willock, who claimed Duncanson had flirted with him.
 May 16, 2007 – Sean William Kennedy, 20, was walking to his car from Brew's Bar in Greenville, South Carolina, when Stephen Andrew Moller, 18, got out of another car and approached Kennedy. Investigators said that Moller made a comment about Kennedy's sexual orientation, and threw a fatal punch because he did not like the other man's sexual preference.
 September 9, 2007 – A gay bashing occurred in the Towers West Quiznos on the campus of Vanderbilt University in Nashville, Tennessee. A student, Robert Gutierrez, and a non-student hurled homophobic abuse at two gay students and beat one up. A report was filed with the Vanderbilt University Police Department, and Gutteriez was reportedly suspended, although it could not be confirmed. Gutteriez dismissed it as "just a fight", but the dean of students suggested it was "a premeditated, unprovoked attack". The victims were not named to protect their anonymity.
 October 2007 – Steven Domer, a 62-year-old gay man, was murdered in Oklahoma.
 December 8, 2007 – 25-year-old gay man Nathaniel Salerno was attacked by four men on a Metro train in Washington, DC. The men called him "faggot" while they beat him.
 January 8, 2008 – Stacey Brown, a black 30-year-old trans woman, was found dead in her apartment. She had been shot in the head. 
 July 1, 2008 –  Ebony Whitaker, an African American trans woman, was shot and killed in Memphis.
 February 2008 – Duanna Johnson, a trans woman, was beaten by a police officer while she was held in the Shelby County Criminal Justice Center in Tennessee. Johnson said the officers reportedly called her a "faggot" and "he-she", before and during the incident. In November 2008, she was found dead in the street, reportedly gunned down by three unknown individuals.
 February 4, 2008 – Ashley Sweeney, a trans woman, was shot in the head. Her body was found in Detroit, Michigan. 
 February 10, 2008 – Sanesha Stewart, a 25-year-old black trans woman, was stabbed to death in Bronx, New York. 
 February 12, 2008 – Lawrence "Larry" King, a 15-year-old junior high school student, was shot twice by a classmate at E.O. Green School in Oxnard, California. He was taken off life support after doctors declared him brain dead on February 15. According to Associated Press reports, "prosecutors have charged a 14-year-old classmate with premeditated murder with hate-crime and firearm-use enhancements".
 February 22, 2008 – Simmie Williams Jr. was a black gender-nonconforming 17-year-old, who was shot dead on a street corner in Broward County, Florida. 
 March 16, 2008 – Police say Lance Neve was beaten unconscious in Rochester, New York because Neve was gay. A man attacked Neve at a bar leaving him with a fractured skull and a broken nose. Jesse Parsons was sentenced to more than five years in prison for the assault.
 May 29, 2008 – Eighteen-year-old Steven Parrish, a member of the 92 Family Swans subgroup of the Bloods, was murdered by Steven T. Hollis III and Juan L. Flythe on orders from gang leader Timothy Rawlings Jr., in Baltimore County, Maryland after they found "gay messages" on his cell phone. They felt having a gay member would make their gang appear weak. Hollis III pleaded guilty and was sentenced to life in prison, Flythe was given a life sentence with all but 30 years suspended, and Rawlings was sentenced to life in prison without the possibility of parole. A fourth man, Benedict Wureh, pleaded guilty to being an accessory after the fact and was sentenced to time served, about 17 months.
 June 9, 2008 – Jeremy Waggoner, an openly gay hairstylist from Royal Oak, Michigan, was brutally murdered in Detroit. His murder is still unsolved.
 July 17, 2008 – Eighteen-year-old Angie Zapata, a trans woman, was beaten to death in Colorado two days after meeting Allen Ray Andrade. The case was prosecuted as a hate crime, and Andrade was found guilty of first degree murder on April 22, 2009.
 August 20, 2008 – Nahkia Williams, a black trans woman, was shot to death in Louisville, Kentucky. Damon Malone was charged with her murder, robbery, and burglary, and sentenced to 35 years in prison. 
 September 7, 2008 – Tony Randolph Hunter, 27, and his partner were attacked and beaten near a gay bar in Washington, D.C. Hunter later died from his injuries on September 18. Police are investigating it as a possible hate crime.
 September 13, 2008 – 26-year-old Nima Daivari was attacked in Denver, Colorado, by a man who called him "faggot". The police that arrived on the scene refused to make a report of the attack.
 September 21, 2008 – 22-year-old trans woman Ruby Molina's nude body was found facedown on the bank of a river in isolated and undeveloped area in Sacramento, California.  
 November 7, 2008 – The home of openly gay Melvin Whistlehunt in Newton, North Carolina, was destroyed by arsonists. Investigators found homophobic graffiti spray-painted on the back of the house.
 November 14, 2008 – 22-year-old Lateisha Green, a trans woman, was shot and killed by Dwight DeLee in Syracuse, New York, because he thought she was gay. Local news media reported the incident with her legal name, Moses "Teish" Cannon.  DeLee was convicted of first-degree manslaughter as a hate crime on July 17, 2009, and received the maximum sentence of 25 years in state prison.  This was only the second time in the nation's history that a person was prosecuted for a hate crime against a transgender person and the first hate crime conviction in New York state.
 December 12, 2008 – A 28-year-old lesbian in Richmond, California, was kidnapped and gang raped by four men who made homophobic remarks during the attack.
 December 26, 2008 – Taysia Elzy, a 34-year-old trans woman, and her partner, 22-year-old Michael Hunt, were shot to death and left for dead in their apartment by 20-year-old Chris Conwell. 
 December 27, 2008 – 24-year-old Nathan Runkle was brutally assaulted in Dayton, Ohio, outside a gay nightclub.
 January 17, 2009 – Caprice Curry, a 31-year-old trans woman in San Francisco, California, was stabbed to death. 
 February 15, 2009 – Efosa Agbontaen and Branden McGillvery-Dummett were attacked in New York City by four young men with glass bottles and box cutters who used anti-gay slurs during the attack. Agbontaen and McGillvery-Dummett both required emergency room treatment for their injuries.
 February 18, 2009 – Two men were arrested in Stroudsburg, Pennsylvania, for the stabbing death of gay veteran Michael Goucher.
 March 1, 2009 – Three men entered a bar in Galveston, Texas, and attacked patrons with rocks. One of the victims, Marc Bosaw, was sent to the emergency room to have twelve staples in his head.
 March 14, 2009 – A gay couple leaving a Britney Spears concert in Newark, New Jersey, were attacked by 15 teens. Josh Kehoe and Bobby Daniel Caldwell were called "faggots" and beaten. Caldwell suffered a broken jaw.
 March 23, 2009 – Two gay men were attacked in Seaside, Oregon, and left lying unconscious on a local beach. The men regained consciousness and were treated at a nearby hospital.
 April 6, 2009 – Carl Joseph Walker-Hoover, an 11-year-old child in Springfield, Massachusetts, hanged himself with an extension cord after being bullied all school year by peers who said "he acted feminine" and was gay.
 April 10, 2009 – Justin Goodwin, 36, of Salem, Massachusetts, was attacked and beaten by as many as six people outside a bar in Gloucester, Massachusetts. Goodwin suffered a shattered jaw, broken eye socket, broken nose and broken cheekbone.  Goodwin later died by suicide. Brothers Jonathan and William Chadwick, both of Gloucester, and John Curley-Brotman of Boston, Massachusetts, pleaded guilty to charges of assault and battery with a dangerous weapon. The assault was not considered a hate crime by authorities despite pressure from the Goodwin family to declare it so.  On June 23, 2010, the Chadwick brothers were each sentenced to four years in state prison, and Curley-Brotman was sentenced to two years in the county jail of Middleton, Massachusetts.
 June 18, 2009 – Patti Hammond Shaw, an African-American trans woman, turned herself into a police station in Washington, D.C., after receiving a letter saying there was a warrant for her arrest on charges of making a false police report. Despite producing documents supporting her right to be housed with other women, she was placed in a men's facility. According to her suit, officers "groped her breasts, buttocks and between her legs repeatedly and excessively". She is now suing Washington D.C. Metropolitan Police Department and the U.S. Marshals service for the treatment she received.
 June 30, 2009 – Seaman August Provost was found shot to death and his body burned at his guard post on Camp Pendleton. LGBT community leaders "citing military sources initially said that Provost's death was a hate crime." Provost had been harassed because of his sexual orientation. Military leaders have since explained that "whatever the investigation concludes, the military's "Don't ask, don't tell" policy prevented Provost from seeking help." Family and friends believe he was murdered because he was openly gay (or bisexual according to some family and sources); the killer died by suicide a week later after admitting the murder, the Navy have not concluded if this was a hate crime.
 October 25, 2009 – Dee Green, a trans woman, was found by police unconscious, stabbed in the heart, and bleeding on a street in Baltimore, Maryland. She was taken to a hospital where she died half an hour later. Larry Douglas was charged with first-degree murder in April 2010.
 November 2009 – Jason Mattison Jr., an openly gay 15-year-old boy, was violently murdered and raped at his aunt's house by 35-year-old Dante Parrish, a family friend who had been in prison for murder previously. Parrish was convicted for Mattison's murder and in April 2012 was sentenced to life without parole (the conviction included a second life term for attempted sexual assault).
 December 9, 2009 – Mariah Malina Qualls' body was found in a San Francisco hotel. She was a 23-year-old transgender woman who volunteered and was a member of the Asian & Pacific Islander Wellness Center's TRANS:THRIVE community.

2010–2019

2010 
 January 18, 2010 – The half-naked corpse of Myra Chanel Ical, a 51-year-old trans woman, was found in a vacant lot in Houston, Texas.
 March 30, 2010 – Amanda Gonzalez-Andujar, a 29-year-old Latina trans woman, was found dead in her Queens, New York, apartment. The autopsy found that her attacker, Rasheen Everett, had strangled her, then doused her body with bleach. In December 2013 Everett was sentenced to 29 years to life. At sentencing Everett's lawyer, John Scarpa, disputed the sentence with the statement: "Who is the victim in this case? Is the victim a person in the higher end of the community?" The judge, Queens Supreme Court Justice Richard Buchter, responded, "This court believes every human life is sacred ... It's not easy living as a transgender, and I commend the family for supporting her."
 April 3, 2010 – Toni Alston, a black 44-year-old transgender woman, was shot in the front door of her home in western Charlotte, North Carolina.
 May 7, 2010 – Dana A. "Chanel" Larkin, a 26-year-old black trans woman who worked as a prostitute, was shot three times in the head by her client, Andrew Olacirequi, after she asked him if he was okay with them having sex despite her male genitalia. She was found dead on the pavement of a Milwaukee street.
 June 21, 2010 – Sandy Woulard, a 28-year-old trans woman, was shot in the chest in South Side, Chicago. A passing motorist found her lying in the street, and she was pronounced dead at the hospital. 
 September 11, 2010 – Victoria Carmen White, a 28-year-old black transgender woman, died of bullet wounds in her New Jersey apartment. It is unknown whether she was targeted by her killer, Alrashim Chambers, for her gender identity.
 October 3, 2010 – A 30-year-old male known as "la Reina" (the Queen), Bryan Almonte, and Brian Cepeda, both 17, were kidnapped in the Bronx by a homophobic group of youths calling themselves the Latin King Goonies, sodomized by foreign objects including a plunger and baseball bat, burned with cigarettes, and tortured for hours. One of the teenage victims had wanted to join the gang the attackers were part of, but when members saw him with the 30-year-old, they later picked him up and took him to an abandoned apartment, and asked him if the two had had sex. When the teenager responded positively, he was beaten and sodomized. The gang later picked up the second teenager whom they had also seen with the 30-year-old and repeated the process. They then lured the 30-year-old to the building with the promise of a party. When he arrived with alcohol, the gang tied him up and tortured him, and made the 17-year-old burn him with cigarettes. They then robbed the man's 40-year-old brother, coercing him by putting a cellphone to his ear so he could hear his brother beg to pay them.
 October 14, 2010 – Stacey Blahnik Lee, a 31-year-old black trans woman, was found murdered in her Philadelphia home by her boyfriend.
 November 17, 2010 – 18-year-old Joshua Wilkerson was found dead in a field in Pearland, Texas, after being beaten to death and set on fire by a friend of five years, Hermilo Moralez. This was supposedly retaliation for unwanted sexual advances.
 December 2010 - Kevin Mark Powell and Stephen Duane Adams, a married gay couple from Florida, were shot in their home by Peter Avsenew. Peter Avsenew in his conviction sent a letter to a judge, which said "You will never be able to stop me. It is my duty as a white man to cull the weak and timid from existence. I will stand up for what I believe in and eradicate anything in my way. Homosexuals are a disgrace to mankind and must be put down. These weren’t the first and they won’t be the last". Avsenew was initially sentenced to death but after a new trial, he was sentenced to life in prison.

2011
 January 11, 2011 – Chrissie Bates, a 45-year-old transgender woman, was stabbed to death in her downtown Minneapolis apartment. Arnold Darwin Waukazo was sentenced to 367 months in prison for the murder.
 February 19, 2011 – Tyra Trent, a black 25-year-old trans woman, was found strangled to death in a vacant house.
 April 2011 –  Kevin Pennington, a gay 28-year-old male, was kidnapped and severely beaten in a Kentucky park by two men shouting anti-gay epithets. David Jason Jenkins and Anthony Ray Jenkins face possible life sentences for anti-gay hate crimes. On March 15, 2012, the Kentucky State Police assisted the FBI in arresting David Jenkins, Anthony Jenkins, Mable Jenkins, and Alexis Jenkins of Partridge, Kentucky, for the beating of Kevin Pennington during a late-night attack in April 2011 at Kingdom Come State Park, near Cumberland. The push came from the gay-rights group Kentucky Equality Federation, whose president, Jordan Palmer, began lobbying the U.S. Attorney for the Eastern District of Kentucky in August 2011 to prosecute after stating he had no confidence in the Harlan County Commonwealth's Attorney to act. "I think the case's notoriety may have derived in large part from the Kentucky Equality Federation efforts," said Harvey, the U.S. Attorney for the Eastern District of Kentucky.  Mable Jenkins and Alexis Jenkins pled guilty.
 April 22, 2011 – Chrissy Lee Polis, a 22-year-old trans woman, was beaten in a violent struggle by two African-American women for entering the women's bathroom in Baltimore County, Maryland, which triggered her to have a seizure. A McDonald's employee, who was later fired, filmed the encounter and released the film on the internet; it since went viral. Teonna Monae Brown, 19, pleaded guilty to first-degree assault and a hate crime in the beating and was sentenced to five years in prison, plus three years of supervised probation. The other woman was charged as a juvenile and committed to a juvenile detention facility.
 June 2011 – Rosita Hernandez, a Cuban trans woman, was stabbed to death in Miami. In November 2011, Miguel Pavon was charged with first-degree murder after his DNA was matched with samples found in the victim's residence.
 June 5, 2011 – CeCe McDonald, a young African American trans woman, was attacked outside a tavern shortly after midnight in Minneapolis, Minnesota. CeCe fatally stabbed her attacker with a pair of scissors. She was subsequently convicted of manslaughter and jailed for 19 months in a men's prison. 
 July 20, 2011 – Lashai Mclean, a 23-year-old African American trans woman, was shot to death in Northeast, Washington, D.C.
 August 11, 2011 – Camila Guzman, a Latina transgender woman, was found murdered in her apartment in East Harlem, Manhattan.
 September 8, 2011 – Cameron Nelson, a 32-year-old gay man, was attacked at his place of employment in Utah.
 October 11, 2011 – Shelley Hilliard, a black transgender teen who had been reported missing, had her burnt torso identified by police in Detroit. Her killer, 30-year-old Qasim Raqib, was sentenced on March 6, 2012, to 25–40 years in jail.
 November 15, 2011 – Danny Vega, a 58-year-old Asian-American gay man who worked as a hairdresser in Rainier Valley, Seattle, was beaten and robbed as he was taking a walk. The beating left Vega in a coma from which he later died. 
 November 17, 2011 – Cassidy Nathan Vickers, a 32-year-old black transgender woman, died from a gunshot wound to the chest in Hollywood. Her killer, who is still unidentified, is also suspected of shooting and attempting to rob another black transgender woman on the same day.
 December 17, 2011 – Charlie Hernandez, a 26-year-old who was openly gay, was stabbed to death following a brawl that included anti-gay slurs that occurred with two men after he accidentally stepped on some sunglasses. 
 December 24, 2011 –  Dee Dee Pearson, a 31-year-old transgender woman, died from bullet wounds in Kansas City, Missouri. Kenyan L. Jones was charged with second-degree murder and armed criminal action. Jones told police he paid to have sexual relations with Pearson, believing her to be a cisgender woman, but hours after having sex with her, discovered she was not.  Angered by what he considered to be a deception, he got a 9 mm caliber handgun, found Ms Pearson, and killed her. Jones was arrested on suspicion of her murder.
 December 29, 2011 – The body of Give Goines, a black 23-year-old trans woman who had been reported missing two weeks beforehand, was found in a scrapheap in New Orleans. An autopsy set that the time of her death as much as two days before her body was discovered and that she had been strangled.

2012
 January 21, 2012 – Crain Conaway, a black 47-year-old trans woman, was found dead in her home in Oceanside, California.  Tyree Paschall Monday was arrested in connection with her murder.
 February 2, 2012 – JaParker "Deoni" Jones, a 23-year-old black trans woman, was stabbed in the head while waiting at a Metrobus stop in Washington, D.C.
 February 2012 – Cody Rogers, an 18-year-old teenager, was brutally assaulted and targeted with homophobic slurs at a party in Oklahoma after defending a female friend who was also attacked.
 March 8, 2012 – A gay Black man was sexually and physically assaulted by two men in Corpus Christi, Texas. The victim was invited to an apartment, when Jimmy Garza and Ramiro Serrata Jr. physically attacked him over the course of three hours. The victim was also sodomized with a broom and threatened with a gun, until he was able to escape through an apartment window. Garza and Serrata Jr. were sentenced to fifteen years for their roles in the attack.
 March 24, 2012 – Several transgender and crossdressing people were shot at and robbed in Florida by a man, suspected to be De Los Santos. 23-year-old Tyrell Jackson was fatally wounded in the shooting, which also injured 20-year-old Michael Hunter.
 April 3, 2012 – Coko Williams, a black trans woman, was found murdered in East Detroit, Michigan. The homicide may have been related to Coko's involvement in sex work.
 April 16, 2012 –  Paige Clay, 23, a black trans woman, was found dead, with a bullet wound to her face in West Garfield Park, Chicago. The death was ruled as a homicide.
 April 21, 2012 – Eric Unger, a 23-year-old gay man living in Illinois, was attacked by a group of men on the way home from a party, while they shouted anti-gay epithets at him. The investigation is ongoing.
 May 2012 –  Max Pelofske, a 21-year-old gay man, was beaten by a group of youths at a party in Minnesota. Penske claims it was a hate crime, but police disagree.
 June 5, 2012 –  Kardin Ulysse, a black 14-year-old boy, was attacked in the cafeteria of Roy Mann Junior High School in Brooklyn, New York, by another group of boys. He was called anti-gay slurs and sustained damage to the cornea of one of his eyes, leaving him blinded. Ulysse's parents planned on suing New York City for failing to supervise its students properly.
 June 23, 2012 – Mollie Olgin, 19 years old, and her girlfriend, Kristene Chapa, 18 years old, were found shot in the head near Violet Andrews Park in Portland, Texas.  Olgin died at the scene and Chapa survived. Law enforcement has said there is no evidence to suggest that the incident is a hate crime. The Human Rights Campaign and Equality Texas urged a thorough investigation by the U.S. Department of Justice, the FBI and Portland police to find the shooter.
 July 5, 2012 – Tracy Johnson, a 40-year-old black trans woman, was found dead from gunshot wounds in Baltimore, Maryland. 
 August 14, 2012 – Tiffany Gooden, a 19-year-old black trans woman, was found murdered on the second floor of an abandoned building in Chicago. An autopsy verified that she had been stabbed to death. Notably, the body of Paige Clay, another young black trans woman, was discovered April 3 blocks away from where Tiffany was found. The pair were known as friends. 
 August 18, 2012 –  Kendall Hampton, a 26-year-old black trans woman, died of gunshot wounds. Eugene Carlos Dukes was arrested in early September for her murder, and indicted later that month.
 August 26, 2012 – Deja Jones, a 33-year-old black trans woman, was shot to death in Miami. No arrest had been made. 
September 3, 2012 – The body of Kyra Cordova, a 27-year-old trans woman, was found in a wooded area in Frankford, Philadelphia.
 October 15, 2012 – Janette Tovar, a 43-year-old trans woman was murdered by her partner, Jonathan Kenney, according to police, who beat her and slammed her head into the concrete. He was later arrested for her murder.
 November 10, 2021 – Austin Head, a progressive community activist and openly gay man, was assaulted by brothers Jermon Barnes and Ernie Barnes in Phoenix, Arizona. Head was knocked unconscious during the attack and was hospitalized due to the multiple injuries he sustained. Both Barnes brothers were charged and convicted for their role in the attack.

2013
 March 1, 2013 – Sondra Scarber addressed a parent about her girlfriend's son being bullied at Seabourn Elementary School in Mesquite, Texas, and was beaten by him when he realized that she was a lesbian.
 May 17, 2013 – Mark Carson, a 32-year-old black gay man, was shot to death by another man who trailed and taunted him and a friend as they walked down the street in Greenwich Village, Manhattan. When the two friends ignored the assailant's questions, the man began yelling anti-gay slurs and asked one of them, "You want to die tonight?" Elliot Morales, 33, was arrested briefly after the shooting and charged with murder and weapons charges on May 19. According to police, Morales said he shot Carson because he was "acting tough". Morales pleaded not guilty, but on March 9, 2016, he was convicted by a Manhattan jury of murder as a hate crime. Morales was sentenced on June 14, 2016, to 40 years to life in prison.
 May 22, 2013 – Gabriel Fernandez, an eight-year-old boy, was tortured and murdered by his mother and her boyfriend because they believed the child to be gay. Prosecutor Jon Hatami detailed the acts allegedly committed by Isauro Aguirre and the boy's mother, Pearl Fernandez, who also faces trial.  Hatami explained that the Palmdale couple beat Gabriel, bit him, burned him with cigarettes, whipped him, shot him with a B.B. gun, starved him, fed him cat litter, and kept him gagged and bound in a cubby hold closet until he was found on May 22, 2013, dying of blunt force trauma to the head. He died two days later in the hospital. The couple called first responders to treat Gabriel, but that was only in an attempt to mislead, the prosecutor said. In June 2018, Aguirre was sentenced to death and Fernandez was sentenced to life in prison without the possibility of parole.
 June 2, 2013 – Matthew Fenner was beaten and choked for hours by church members. He says the attacks took place "to break [him] free of the homosexual demons they so viciously despise".
 October 2013 - Carmen Guerrero, (a transgender woman sentenced to life in prison for the murder of her girlfriend Mary Perkins) was bound, gagged, tortured, and murdered by her cellmate, Miguel Crespo, at Kern Valley State Prison in California. Miguel Crespo was sentenced to death in 2019.
 November 4, 2013 – Sasha Fleischman, an agender 18-year-old, had their skirt set on fire while they were sleeping on an AC Transit bus in Oakland, California. Police arrested 16-year-old Richard Thomas and charged him with felony assault, with an enhancement of inflicting great bodily injury. Thomas admitted to police that he had started the fire and that he did it because he was "homophobic". On November 14, 2014, Thomas was sentenced to seven years in juvenile detention for his crime. The attack on Fleischman and their and recovery were the subject of an article in the New York Times Magazine, an article which later became the basis for a related non-fiction book titled The 57 Bus.
 December 31, 2013 – A fire was started in the stairway of a gay nightclub in Seattle, which was quickly extinguished. After suspect Musab Mohammaed Masmari had told a friend that "homosexuals should be exterminated", an informer from the Muslim community told the FBI Masamari may have also been planning terrorist attacks. The native of Benghazi, Libya, was arrested en route to Turkey. Masmari was sentenced to 10 years on federal arson charges.

2014
 March 1, 2014 – Jipsta, a well-known and openly gay white rapper, was the victim of a bias attack in a New York City subway station as he and his partner were celebrating their 10-year anniversary. The assailant hurled vicious homophobic slurs at the couple, and following a verbal disagreement, Jipsta was brutally beaten by the unidentified subject, resulting in multiple fractures to his face. As a result of the incident, Jipsta required surgery due to seven broken bones sustained to his nose and eye socket, which forced him to cease promotion of his sophomore album Turnt Up.
 March 6, 2014 – Britney Cosby, 24, and Crystal Jackson, 24, were murdered by Britney's father, James 'Larry' Cosby. The victims were a lesbian couple survived by Crystal's five-year-old daughter. Britney was strangled and beaten to death. Crystal was also beaten and strangled, though a gunshot wound to her temple was the cause of death.
 June 1, 2014 – Ahmed Said, 27, and Dwone Anderson-Young, 23, were killed execution-style shortly after midnight in the Leschi neighborhood of Seattle shortly after they left a gay nightclub. Both victims were gay, and Ahmed was apparently lured by being contacted on Grindr, a social app popular with gay men. Anderson-Young was receiving a ride home from Ahmed Said. The case was soon investigated as a possible hate crime. Both Said and Anderson-Young were shot multiple times; Anderson-Young died inside Said's car, while Said died immediately outside. Suspect Ali Muhammad Brown has confessed to killing Said, Anderson-Young, and two men in Seattle and New Jersey, both of whom were not gay. Brown had previously been convicted of bank fraud and is believed to be in support of Muslim terrorists in Somalia. He told investigators that he was guided strictly by his faith, and that the killings were "just" because they were in retaliation for actions by the U.S. government in Iraq, Syria, and Afghanistan.

2015
 February 1, 2015 – Taja DeJesus, 36, a trans woman, was found stabbed to death in the Bayview neighborhood of San Francisco, California.
 April 13, 2015 – Ron Lane was shot dead by a former student of Wayne Community College, identified as Kenneth M. Stancil III, who he had supervised at the campus print shop. His mother made unconfirmed allegations that Lane, who was gay, made unwanted sexual advances towards Stancil. The shooting was investigated as a hate crime.
 May 5, 2015 – Jonathan Snipes, 25, and Ethan York-Adams, 25, were the victim of a homophobic attack in a New York City restaurant. When two male patrons in the restaurant directed homophobic slurs towards the couple, Snipes confronted the patrons. The patrons then physically escalated their argument, where Snipes was pushed to the ground and repeatedly kicked. York-Adams and Snipes were then hit with a char. Both suspects fled the restaurant, while the victims sustained multiple injuries.

2016
 2015 – In 2016, for the first time the Justice Department used the Matthew Shepard and James Byrd, Jr. Hate Crimes Prevention Act to bring criminal charges against a person for selecting a victim because of their gender identity. In that case Joshua Brandon Vallum pled guilty to murdering Mercedes Williamson in 2015 because she was transgender, in violation of the Matthew Shepard and James Byrd, Jr. Hate Crimes Prevention Act.
 February 15, 2016 – Anthony Gooden and Marquez Tolbert, experienced facial and bodily second and third-degree burns after Martin Luther Blackwell, 43, poured boiling water on them as they were sleeping. Gooden was comatose for two weeks, during his five-week hospitalization.
April 29, 2016 – Steven Nelson 49, assaulted by Kelly Schneider, 23, in a secluded wildlife area near Lake Lowell, Idaho.  Scheinder kicked Nelson 20-30 times with steel-toed boots, after which he was robbed of his clothes, his credit cards and his car keys and left to die in the cold.  Nelson was able to get up and walk to a nearby home and call for help.  He was taken to a local hospital but died later that morning.  Schneider was sentenced to 28 years to life in prison.
 June 12, 2016 – A massacre at the Orlando gay nightclub Pulse left 49 dead and 53 wounded. The gunman, 29-year-old Omar Mateen, was an American citizen of Afghan descent who pledged allegiance to the terrorist organization ISIS in a 9-1-1 call he made about the attack. ISIS also claimed responsibility for the attack. The incident was the largest attack targeting LGBT people in the US.
 July 29, 2016 – Levi Frerichs, a gay man, was attacked by a group of six teenagers as he was walking home in Chicago, Illinois. The teenagers noticed Freirichs and began to throw blows to his head, while taunting him with homophobic slurs.
 September 7, 2016 – Michael Phillips was attacked after leaving his job at a gay bar. He and his husband say they have been targeted for their sexual orientation multiple times.

2017
 March 5, 2017 – Two men were stabbed in Brooklyn, New York after they left a gay nightclub. James Thomas, 32, noticed the men waiting to patronize a nearby restaurant, and began to shout homophobic slurs. Thomas then slashed the first victim in the face, and stabbed the second victim in the torso and shoulder. A third man was threatened and pushed to the ground during the attack.
 May 20, 2017 – A lesbian woman, 24, was assaulted by Antoine Thomas on the New York City Subway. Thomas noticed that the woman boarded the train with her partner, and directed homophobic slurs towards them. Thomas then attacked the victim until she was unconscious. Due to the attack, the victim was subsequently hospitalized for a concussion, multiple deep cuts, and a broken eye socket.
 August 28, 2017 – A gay man was beaten by thugs after they shouted homophobic slurs at him. He suffered a broken jaw from the attack.
 September 2017 – Ally Steinfeld, a transgender teenager, was stabbed to death and mutilated by three young people in Cabool, Missouri.
 November 8, 2017 – A 17-year-old gay teenager was allegedly attacked by 18-year-old Trevon Godbolt. Godbolt reportedly made the victim strip off his clothes and possessions, then beat him and took his clothes. Another man and two women were involved, one of whom recorded the attack on a cell phone. The video was later posted on Facebook.

2018
 January 2, 2018 – Blaze Bernstein, an openly gay Jewish college student, was stabbed more than 20 times. Samuel Woodward, an avowed neo-Nazi and member of the group Atomwaffen Division, was charged with his murder.
 March 7, 2018 – Ta'Ron 'Rio' Carson, a gay man, was fatally shot as he left the Aura nightclub in Kansas City, Missouri.
 March 28, 2018 – Amia Tyrae, a black transgender woman, was found dead in a motel room in Baton Rouge, Louisiana, with multiple gunshot wounds. Nevaa White, a friend of Tyrae's, said that Tyrae had lived her life as an openly trans woman since 2009. White also said Tyrae was bullied and "didn't have an easy life."
 June 2, 2018 - Four gay men were chased by a mob of approximately twenty men following a Pride event in Salt Lake City, Utah.
 June 17, 2018 – Darnell Morgan, a black gay man, was attacked by five men while visiting Las Vegas, Nevada for a relative's wedding. 
 June 21, 2018 – Anthony Avalos, a ten-year old, succumbs to fatal abuse injuries in a hospital. When his mother Heather Barron and her boyfriend Kareem Leiva were subsequently arrested for Avalos' death, family relatives later revealed that Avalos expressed to his mother he, "liked boys and girls.". Child welfare investigators discovered that Barron referred to Avalos with a homophobic slur, while Leiva stated he was "uncomfortable being around gay people."
 November 28, 2018 – A 20-year-old woman was assaulted on the New York City Subway by Allah Allasheed, following a brief kiss shared with another women. Allasheed engaged the victim with homophobic slurs, and later struck her. The victim suffered a fractured spine as a result of the attack.
 November 29, 2018 – Vincent Shaver and Charles Clements were followed and assaulted by multiple men outside of their home. Both men were beaten and Shaver suffered a punctured lung during the attack, due to being stabbed with a piece of broken glass.

2019 
 January 29, 2019 – Spencer Deehring and Tristan Perry, a gay couple, were assaulted by multiple men when leaving a gay club in Austin, Texas. The men directed homophobic slurs towards the couple, then the suspects began to punch Perry repeatedly. When Deehring attempted to defend his partner, he became the target of physical assault. Both victims were knocked unconscious during the attack, and were later hospitalized.
 May 28, 2019 – Four people are charged with targeting gay men for kidnapping and robbery on Grindr in Dallas, Texas during 2017. The four men all eventually plead guilty to various charges in individual cases from 2019 - 2021.
 June 16, 2019 – Karl Craven and Braden Brecht, were assaulted and robbed by multiple men in Washington, D.C. Following some assailants directing homophobic slurs towards the couple, the group decided to attack Brecht. Craven suffered a bruise on his head, while Craven suffered multiple cuts, bruises, a chipped tooth, and a lip cut. Additionally, the assailants stole Craven's wallet and Brecht's phone.
 July 29, 2019 – A gay man in was attacked by three people in Racine, Wisconsin. The victim suffered multiple bruises throughout his body and a broken jaw. The severity of the broken jaw injury led to the removal of all the victim's teeth.
 December 16, 2019 – An arsonist burned the drop-in office of SisTers PGH, a transgender resource center led by black and transgender people, in Pittsburgh, Pennsylvania.

2020–2022

2020 
 January 24, 2020 –  Serena Daniari, a writer and transgender activist, was attacked while riding a subway train in New York City by Pablo Valles. Valles identified Daniari, then proceeded to spit, hit, and verbally denigrate the victim with slurs.
 May 27, 2020 – Tony McDade, a black transgender male, was shot and killed by Tallahassee Police.
 June 1, 2020 – During the George Floyd protests, on May 30, an LGBT+ bar in Raleigh, North Carolina, was vandalized with a white supremacist symbol. Tim Lemuel, the owner of the Ruby Deluxe bar, returned to his business the following evening to deter vandals and to offer first aid to protesters who had been tear-gassed or pepper-sprayed. Just after midnight, the police ordered Lemuel off his business rental property, firing warning shots at him and his staff.
 June 20, 2020 – Holden White, an 18-year-old gay man, was assaulted by Chance Seneca. White was choked to the point of unconsciousness by Seneca with a cord. Then, Seneca mutilated White's throat with the tip of a knife, and cut White's wrists. White survived the attack, and criticized authorities for delaying to pursue hate crime charges.
 June 26, 2020 – Christian Council was assaulted by Amery Dickerson and Bennett Stone in Edmond, Oklahoma. When Council and his friend exited a car, Dickerson and Stone confronted them with a homophobic slur. Subsequently, both assailants began to assault Council until he was unconscious. Council suffered a gash below his eye and bruising throughout his head and body.
 July 20, 2020 – A transgender teenager was assaulted in a park by Travis Crawford in La Crosse, Wisconsin. While at the park with their partner, who is also transgender, the victim was approached by Crawford. The suspect directed homophobic slurs towards them,  then proceeded to punch and kick the victim.
 August 6, 2020 –  A man was arrested for verbally harassing and physically assaulting patrons of LGBTQ+ establishments in Madison, Wisconsin. A 34-year-old victim was left bleeding as a result of one of the attacks, while a 41-year-old victim was left with injuries to his arm.

2021 

 March 11, 2021 – A transgender woman was attacked by Johnny Moreno, 23, with a skateboard in Costa Mesa, California. Moreno repeatedly hit the victim with his skateboard, and utilized homophobic slurs throughout the attack. Subsequently, Moreno threatened a passerby who called the police for assistance. Following the attack, Moreno was charged with assault with hate crime enhancement.
 March 20, 2021 – A 32-year-old transgender woman was stabbed during an attempted sexual assault in Philadelphia, Pennsylvania.
 March 22, 2021 –  A gunman fired into a home of an unidentified victim with the intent to kill in Basin, Montana. The indictment for John Russell Howard includes that he wanted to, "get rid of the lesbians [and] gays."
 May 21, 2021 – The body of Poe Black, a 21-year-old transgender man, is found in an unincorporated area of Niland, California.
 July 5, 2021 – A gay man was brutally attacked after being lured on a date through Grindr by Daniel Andrew McGee in Eugene, Oregon. The victim suffered from a partially missing scalp, and was hospitalized as a result of the attack. McGee was charged with a hate crime as a result of his attack.
 August 6, 2021 –  An unidentified gay man is attacked by four members of the Makarenko family. The Makarenko family accused the man of "making" the youngest son gay; the suspects were not charged until 2022.
 August 13, 2021 -  Kylen Schulte and Crystal Turner, a married lesbian couple were killed by gunshot wounds by Adam Pinkusiewicz, the motive for the murders is unknown.
 September 2, 2021 – Two unidentified men were brutally assaulted in a Bushwick, Brooklyn bodega by Christopher Clemente and Johnathan Carter. Both victims were hospitalized for multiple stab wounds and collapsed lungs.
 October 24, 2021 – Charlotte Osieczanek, a transgender woman, was attacked by three men during her late night shift at a convenience store. Osieczanek suffered a broken nose, shoulder, and orbital bones as a result of the attack, in addition to bodily bruising and abrasions. The three men were eventually charged for their roles in the attack.
 November 2, 2021 – Jenny de Leon, a Latina transgender woman, was found murdered in Tampa, Florida. de Leon was a frequent attendee of local PFLAG meetings.

2022 
 February 17, 2022 – A 60-year-old gay man was tied up and assaulted with a wrench by Ethan Dickerson, his neighbor. Dickerson cited the victim's sexuality as the reason for the assault.
 March 19, 2022 – A 22-year-old man was attacked while riding a NYC subway train. The suspect repeatedly spat on the victim, then began to assault the victim when they tried to move.
 April 17, 2022 –  James Garcia, a gay man, was attacked while walking his dog by Maurice Charles, 36 in Fort Lauderdale, Florida. As a result of the attack, Garcia had to receive ten stitches.
 April 26, 2022 – An unidentified individual threw a rock through the front door of the Pride Center VT office. As of April, 2022 the incident remains unsolved and is being investigated as a hate crime.
 May 27, 2022 – Tristan Torres, 14, was attacked when he wore a pride flag during the last day of classes at Defiance Middle School in Defiance, Ohio. The assailant threw water at Torres, who was sitting with friends, then proceeded to choke and beat him. As a result of the attack, Torres suffered minor injuries.
 June 1, 2022 – An unidentified individual, 31, was stabbed on the New York City subway. The suspect started a verbal altercation with the victim, utilizing homophobic slurs. Subsequently, the suspect then stabbed the victim, before fleeing the station.
 July 3, 2022 – Noah Ruiz, a 20-year-old transgender man, was assaulted by multiple men while camping in Camden, Ohio. Ruiz was advised to use the women's restroom at a campground site, despite identifying as male. While in the bathroom, a woman angrily confronted Ruiz, and left the bathroom. When Ruiz later exited the bathroom, three men approached Ruiz and proceeded to assault him.
 June 23, 2022 - Naasire Johnson was killed by his gay lover, Kylen Pratt.
 November 19–20, 2022 – A mass shooting at a gay bar in Colorado Springs, Colorado leaves at least five people dead and 25 injured.

See also

References

External links
 www.lgbthatecrimes.org – Database of documented LGBT hate crimes.

Violence